Maareech Advanced Torpedo Defence System (ATDS) is a torpedo detection and countermeasure system used by the Indian Navy. The system offers a complete solution to detect and locate an incoming torpedo and to apply countermeasures to protect naval platform against torpedo attack. It was developed as a joint project of the Naval Physical and Oceanographic Laboratory (NPOL), Kochi and the Naval Science and Technological Laboratory (NSTL), Visakhapatnam. Bharat Electronics is manufacturing it India.

Description 
It is an anti-torpedo system with towed and expendable decoys. The system is capable of detecting, confusing, diverting and decoying the incoming torpedoes. The decoy helps in exhausting the energy of the torpedo by running the later through long and ineffective course and prevents them from homing in to the targeted platform with its advanced counter-measures capabilities.

Mareech systems has been deployed on all the frontline warships of Indian Navy ships.

Operators 
 
 Indian Navy 
 Visakhapatnam-class destroyer

See also 
Varunastra (torpedo) - Indian heavy torpedo
Advanced Light Torpedo Shyena - Indian light torpedo
S.M.A.R.T (missile) - A hybrid weapon under development by DRDO

References

Military equipment of India
Naval warfare
Weapons countermeasures